Filmfare Awards Punjabi are presented to the best films and performers in Punjabi cinema. The Awards were first presented in 2017.

History 
The awards were first awarded in 2017 for Punjabi films of 2016. The ceremony was held on 31 March 2017 at the Multipurpose Sports Stadium in Mohali. It became the second film award for Punjabi films after PTC Punjabi Film Awards, which were introduced in 2011.

Jitesh Pillai on Punjabi Cinema said, “It is a moment of utmost pride, as we witness Filmfare Awards expand its footprints across the nation. We, at Filmfare, have always rewarded creativity and diligence of the films across industries and promote more such wonderful cinematic experiences. The 1st Edition of Filmfare Awards Punjabi 2017 will be a night of grandeur and elegance and we are looking forward to meet and greet the whole of Punjabi film industry.”

Awards

Merit Awards
 Best Film
 Best Actor
 Best Actress
 Best Director
 Best Debut Director
 Best Actor in supporting role
 Best Actress in supporting role
 Best Male Debut
 Best Female Debut
 Best Music Director
 Best Lyricist
 Best playback Singer (male)
 Best Playback Singer (female)

Critics Awards
 Critics Award Best Film
 Critics Award Best Actor
 Critics Award Best Actress

Technical Awards
 Best Story
 Best Screenplay
 Best Dialogue
 Best Background Score
 Best Action
 Best Editing
 Best Cinematography
 Best Choreography
 Best Production Design
 Best Sound Design

Special Awards
 Lifetime Achievement Award
 Living Legend Award

Records

Most Awards to a single film

 Lahoriye (2018) = 9
 Bambukat (2017) = 8
 Love Punjab (2017) = 7
 Rabb Da Radio (2018) = 5
 Ardaas (2017) = 4
 Channa Mereya (2018) = 4

All the top three films are produced by Rhythm Boyz Entertainment.

Best Director

 Ksshitij Chaudhary = 1
 Pankaj Batra = 1

Best Actor

 Ammy Virk = 1
 Diljit Dosanjh = 1

Best Actress

 Sargun Mehta = 2

References

External links 

 
 

Indian film awards
2017 establishments in Punjab, India
Awards established in 2017
Punjab, India awards